Brussels is an unincorporated community located, in the town of Brussels, in Door County, Wisconsin, United States. Brussels uses the ZIP code of 54204.

As of the 2010 census, there were 1,135 people, 403 households, and 303 families living in the town.  Current 2017 population is 1134.

Images

References

Unincorporated communities in Door County, Wisconsin
Unincorporated communities in Wisconsin
Belgian-American culture in Wisconsin